Yogeswari Patkunarajah was the Mayor of Jaffna, Sri Lanka and a member of the United People's Freedom Alliance and the Eelam People's Democratic Party. She was the 18th Mayor of the City and only the second woman to hold the post.

References

Sri Lankan Tamil politicians
United People's Freedom Alliance politicians
Sri Lankan Hindus
Mayors of Jaffna
Eelam People's Democratic Party politicians